Eskridge may refer to:

People 
Charles Eskridge (disambiguation), multiple people
Chauncey Eskridge (1917–1988), American lawyer and judge
Durell Eskridge (born 1991), American football player
D'Wayne Eskridge (born 1997), American football player
George Eskridge (born 1943), American politician
Jack Eskridge (1924–2013), American basketball player
Kelley Eskridge (born 1960), American writer
Robert Lee Eskridge (1891–1975), American genre painter
William Eskridge (born 1951), American academic
Zack Eskridge (born 1988), American football player

Places 
 Eskridge, Kansas
 Eskridge, Mississippi